The Native Mob  is a Native American street gang. The Native Mob is one of the largest and most violent Native American gangs in the U.S. and is notoriously active in Minnesota, Wisconsin, and South Dakota. The gang was created in the 1990s in Minneapolis, Minnesota to control drug turf, and has since established itself in prisons, and was estimated (2015) to have around 1,500 members.

The Native Mob has been present in tribal communities in the region since the gang began in the 1990s. Gang experts say the small town of Cass Lake, Minnesota on the Leech Lake Indian Reservation and Shakopee Mdewakanton Sioux Community Tribal has been the center of the gang's operations, also runs operations out of the Twin Cities, Naytahwaush, and Prior Lake. Members routinely engage in drug trafficking, assault, robbery, and murder.

References

Organizations established in the 1990s
1990s establishments in Minnesota
Native American gangs
Gangs in Minnesota
Gangs in North Dakota
Gangs in South Dakota
Gangs in Wisconsin
Native American history of Minnesota
Native American history of North Dakota
Native American history of South Dakota
Native American history of Wisconsin
Organized crime in Minnesota